Ondřej Holeček (born 14 October 1973) is a Czech rower. He competed in the men's eight event at the 1992 Summer Olympics.

References

1973 births
Living people
Czech male rowers
Olympic rowers of Czechoslovakia
Rowers at the 1992 Summer Olympics
Rowers from Prague